OK K.O.! Let's Play Heroes is an action-adventure beat 'em up video game developed by Capybara Games and published by Cartoon Network Games. It is based on the show OK K.O.! Let's Be Heroes and was released digitally on January 23, 2018 for PlayStation 4, Windows, and Xbox One, with a port to the Nintendo Switch launching physically in 2019. A physical release of the game bundled with Grumpyface Studios' Steven Universe: Save the Light for PlayStation 4, Xbox One, and Switch was released in May 2019.

Plot
When Lord Boxman takes away all the levels of the heroes' pow cards, K.O. must set things right and learn at heart that he is a true hero.

Gameplay
K.O. is controlled when fighting against villains. The player can use moves such as an uppercut, punch combo, low kick, etc. The player can collect their stats after defeating all enemies to earn new moves such as a charge punch, a controllable fist, and a stronger uppercut.

During combat, taking damage or dealing damage will raise a bar towards using a special ability called a Powie Zowie, where the player will summon the character in the card and get help. Some examples include Rad, who allows players to levitate and shoot beams, and Carol, who will appear and start doing a combo in front of the player.

Development
On December 7, 2017, the first trailer for the game was released.

Reception

Upon release, OK K.O.! Let's Play Heroes received mostly positive reviews. A review by PlayStation LifeStyle remarked that the game "shows that licensed kids cartoon adaptations don’t have to be mediocre, and that they can be filled with the same charm as the television shows that made them beloved in the first place.", but was criticized for its repetitive combat.

References

External links
 

2018 video games
Action-adventure games
Capybara Games games
Cartoon Network video games
Nintendo Switch games
PlayStation 4 games
Single-player video games
Video games based on television series
Video games developed in Canada
Windows games
Xbox One games